Norbert Kalucza (born 4 December 1986) is a Hungarian amateur boxer who qualified for the 2008 Olympics.

Career
He qualified for the Olympics by beating German boxer Marcel Schneider in the semi final of a European qualifying tournament.

References 
 Olympic qualifier
 AIBA results for Olympic qualification
 http://www.fpi.it/attachments/article/3156/Almaty%202013%20Entry%20List%2052%20Kg.pdf

Flyweight boxers
Living people
Boxers at the 2008 Summer Olympics
Olympic boxers of Hungary
Hungarian male boxers
1986 births
Hungarian Romani people